Phil Clarke (born January 19, 1977, in Miami, Florida) is a former professional American football linebacker in the National Football League, playing in 50 games for the New Orleans Saints from 1999 to 2002. He attended college at the University of Pittsburgh.

References

1977 births
Living people
American football linebackers
New Orleans Saints players
Pittsburgh Panthers football players